The men's 10,000 metres event at the 2003 Summer Universiade was held on 26 August in Daegu, South Korea.

Results

References
Results

Athletics at the 2003 Summer Universiade
2003